Akira is a 2016 Indian Kannada romantic drama film directed by Naveen Reddy and produced by S2 Entertainments. The film stars Anish Tejeshwar, Aditi Rao and Krishi Tapanda in lead roles. The movie revolves around Akhil's (Anish Tesjeshwar) life, who is dwelling upon his life and his trysts with love. Disturbed and shaken after he gets dumped by Sahithi (Aditi Rao), Akhil (Anish Tejeshwar) meets Lavanya (Krishi Thapanda), who has recently broken up as well. Akhil and Lavanya start to delevop feelings for one another. Things take a turn when he learns that Sahithi and Lavanya are best friends.

Akira is the first Kannada movie to ever be shot in Norway. A few scenes from the movie have been shot from Oslo, along the western coast and some from high up in the mountains.

Cast 
 Anish Tejeshwar as Akhil Raj a.k.a. Akira
 Aditi Rao as Saahithi
 Krishi Tapanda as Lavanya 
 Avinash as Akhil's Father
 Rangayana Raghu as Gun Guddappa
 Bullet Prakash
 Sindhu Loknath in a cameo appearance

Soundtrack

B. Ajaneesh Loknath has composed the music for five songs for which Dhananjay Ranjan, Suni, V. Nagendra Prasad and Chetan have penned the lyrics. Actors Puneeth Rajkumar and Vijay Raghavendra have rendered their voices for a song each.

References

External links
 
 Kannada film Facebook page

2016 films
2010s Kannada-language films
Films shot in Norway
2016 directorial debut films